The Workers' Vanguard Party (Spanish: Vanguardia Obrera, VO) was a small Trotskyist political party in Bolivia.

The Workers' Vanguard Party was established by a dissident fraction which broke away from the Communist Vanguard of the Revolutionary Workers' Party in 1978.

It was led by Filemón Escóbar Escóbar and Ricardo Catoira Marín.

The VO took part in elections in 1978 and presented as its presidential candidate Ricardo Catoira Marín and Filemón Escobar as vice-presidential candidate.

In 1980 the VO took part in an electoral coalition Democratic and Popular Union backing Hernán Siles Zuazo.

In 1984, the Workers' Vanguard Party merged with the Revolutionary Workers' Party-Struggle to form the new Revolutionary Workers' Party-Unified.

Notes

1978 establishments in Bolivia
1984 disestablishments in Bolivia
Communist parties in Bolivia
Defunct political parties in Bolivia
Political parties disestablished in 1984
Political parties established in 1978
Trotskyist organisations in Bolivia